A motorcycle seat (sometimes saddle) is where rider sits, and may also accommodate a passenger.

The most common type of motorcycle seat is a dual saddle or bench seat, which runs along the top of the chassis and is long enough for a passenger to straddle the motorcycle behind the rider. Two detached seats, rather than one elongated one, were more common until the mid 20th century. A single, or solo, seat is only large enough for the rider. They are typical of racing, off-road, and many historic motorcycles. In motorcycle trials, the bikes have no seating at all, as the rider remains standing on the footpegs for the entire competition.

See also 
 Bicycle saddle
 Horse saddle

References

Saddle
Seats